Bela Vista is a municipality located in the Brazilian state of Mato Grosso do Sul. Its population was 24,735 (2020) and its area is 4,946 km2.

References

Municipalities in Mato Grosso do Sul